Probable G-protein coupled receptor 152 is a protein that in humans is encoded by the GPR152 gene.

Model organisms 

Model organisms have been used in the study of GPR152 function. A conditional knockout mouse line called Gpr152tm1b(EUCOMM)Wtsi was generated at the Wellcome Trust Sanger Institute. Male and female animals underwent a standardized phenotypic screen to determine the effects of deletion. Additional screens performed:  - In-depth immunological phenotyping

References

Further reading 

 
 

G protein-coupled receptors